The long nineteenth century is a term for the 125-year period beginning with the onset of the French Revolution in 1789 and ending with the outbreak of World War I in 1914. It was coined by Russian writer Ilya Ehrenburg and British Marxist historian Eric Hobsbawm. The term refers to the notion that the period reflects a progression of ideas which are characteristic to an understanding of the 19th century in Europe.

Background 
The concept is an adaption of Fernand Braudel's 1949 notion of le long seizième siècle ("the long 16th century" 1450–1640) and "a recognized category of literary history", although a period often broadly and diversely defined by different scholars. Numerous authors, before and after Hobsbawm's 1995 publication, have applied similar forms of book titles or descriptions to indicate a selective time frame for their works, such as: S. Kettering, "French Society: 1589–1715 –  the long seventeenth century", E. Anthony Wrigley, "British population during the ‘long’ eighteenth century, 1680–1840", or D. Blackbourn, "The long nineteenth century: A history of Germany, 1780–1918".
However, the term has been used in support of historical publications in order to "connect with broader audiences" and is regularly cited in studies and discussions across academic disciplines, such as history, linguistics and the arts.

Hobsbawm lays out his analysis in The Age of Revolution: Europe 1789–1848 (1962), The Age of Capital: 1848–1875 (1975), and The Age of Empire: 1875–1914 (1987). Hobsbawm starts his long 19th century with the French Revolution, which sought to establish universal and egalitarian citizenship in France, and ends it with the outbreak of World War I, upon the conclusion of which in 1918 the long-enduring European power balance of the 19th century proper (1801–1900) was eliminated.  In a sequel to the above-mentioned trilogy, The Age of Extremes: The Short Twentieth Century, 1914–1991 (1994), Hobsbawm details the short 20th century beginning with World War I and ending with the fall of the Soviet Union.

A more generalized version of the long 19th century, lasting from 1750 to 1914, is often used by Peter N. Stearns in the context of the world history school.

Religious history 
In religious contexts, specifically those concerning the history of the Catholic Church, the long 19th century was a period of centralization of papal power over the Catholic Church. This centralization was in opposition to the increasingly centralized nation states and contemporary revolutionary movements and used many of the same organizational and communication techniques as its rivals.  The church's long 19th century extended from the French Revolution (1789) until the death of Pope Pius XII (1958). This covers the period between the decline of traditional Catholic power and the emergence of secular ideas within states, and the emergence of new thinking within the church after the election of Pope John XXIII.

See also
 18th century
 19th century
 20th century
 Belgium in the long 19th century
 France in the long 19th century
 Long 18th century
 Short 20th century

References

Long 19th century
Historical eras
Historiography
1789
1790s
1900s
1910s
Periodization